Pleșoiu may refer to:

 Pleşoiu, a commune in Olt County, Romania
 Pleșoiu, a village in Livezi Commune, Vâlcea County, Romania
 Pleșoiu, a village in Nicolae Bălcescu Commune, Vâlcea County, Romania

See also 
 Pleșa (disambiguation)
 Pleși (disambiguation)
 Pleașa (disambiguation)